Sergeant John P. Donaldson (August 14, 1842 to January 7, 1920) was an American soldier who fought in the American Civil War. Donaldson received the country's highest award for bravery during combat, the Medal of Honor, for his action during the Battle of Appomattox Courthouse in Virginia on 9 April 1865. He was honored with the award on 3 May 1865.

Biography
Donaldson was born in Butler, Pennsylvania on 14 August 1842. He enlisted into the 4th Pennsylvania Cavalry. He died on 7 January 1920 and his remains are interred at the Mars Hill Cemetery in Iowa.

Medal of Honor citation

See also

List of American Civil War Medal of Honor recipients: A–F

References

1842 births
1920 deaths
People of Pennsylvania in the American Civil War
Union Army officers
United States Army Medal of Honor recipients
American Civil War recipients of the Medal of Honor